There are six National Natural Landmarks in the U.S. state of South Carolina.

See also
List of National Natural Landmarks

References

South Carolina
National Natural Landmarks